Sreenath Bhasi (born 29 May 1988) is an Indian actor, disco jockey and singer who works in Malayalam films. He started his career as a Radio Jockey in Red FM 93.5. At the same time he worked as a Video Jockey. He gained recognition in the film Da Thadiya. He has been featured in numerous films.  He was a part of the Christian alternative metal band named Crimson Wood and is currently the vocalist of an experimental djent band from Kerala.

Personal life 
Sreenath married his long-time girlfriend Reethu Zachariah on 09 December 2016 in Kochi.

Controversies 
Kerala Police filed a case against actor Sreenath Bhasi on 23rd September 2022 for allegedly abusing a youtube channel anchor. On the same day Bhasi abused a malayalam radio journalist during a live interview for Red FM. On 26th September 2022 Sreenath bhasi was taken into police custody for questioning in the verbal abuse case.

Filmography

Discography

References

External links
 
 
 

Indian male film actors
Male actors from Kochi
Living people
Male actors in Malayalam cinema
1988 births
21st-century Indian male actors